Nikolai Apollonovich Belelubsky (1 March [13 March New Style] 1845, Kharkiv – August 4, 1922, Petrograd) was a distinguished Russian academic specialising in railway and civil engineering. Over the course of his life he became a member of many learned societies and the author of many papers and lectures.

Early life

Nikolai Belelubsky was born on 1 (13) March 1845 in Kharkiv into a noble Russian family descended from the 16th century. His family was not well off. He spent his childhood and youth in Taganrog, and graduated with a gold medal from the Taganrog Boys Gymnasium in 1862. In the same year he entered the Institute of Transport (today the St. Petersburg State Transport University), from which he graduated in 1867. Belelubsky was considered to be one of the Institute's greatest graduates. After his graduation he continued to work at the Institute as a private tutor.

He developed an interest in science, especially in bridge building. In 1873, he was appointed Extraordinary Professor in the Department for Building Materials, and three years later he already held the position of Full Professor. He gained international recognition for his research and practice in the fields of bridge engineering and building materials. In 1881, Belelubsky became a member of the Engineering Council of the Ministry of Transport Communications.

Bridge builder

Belelubsky personally designed and managed over 100 projects, including the steel railway bridges across the rivers Don, Danube, Volga, Ob, Kama, Oka, Neva, Irtysh, Belaya, Ufa, Neman, Berezina and many others. The total length of the bridges constructed upon his projects extended .

In 1875, Belelubsky designed the Alexander Railway Bridge in cooperation with Vladimir Ilyich Berezin and Konstantin Yakovlevich Mikhailovsky. The bridge was constructed on the Samara-Zlatoust Railway across the Volga near the city of Syzran. Working on the project, Belelubsky developed a method for analysis of clear headrooms for large bridges, which later came to be widely acknowledged. The bridge provided a critical link between Central Russia and Volga region, allowing to continue the construction of the Trans-Siberian Railway further east, toward Siberia and Turkestan. The construction works involved approximately 2,500 thousand people, required more than 10 thousand cubic metres of masonries and approximately 6,5 tons of iron, and what is more, Belelubsky personally obtained iron from Belgium, demanding metal of the highest quality. (In 2004, the original spans were replaced with new modern ones).

In the period 1881-1884, a two-level rail bridge over the Dnieper in Ekaterinoslav was built under the project of Belelubsky. The lower level was designed for trains only, while the upper — for the passage of horse-drawn vehicles and pedestrians. (The bridge has been significantly strengthen and overhauled in the period from 1930s to 1950s.).

Belelubsky was an excellent experimentalist. He has greatly contributed to the study of construction materials, having made, at least, two important discoveries: he established that domestic cement is no worse than the British one. This has greatly cheapened the process of bridge building. The second crucial breakthrough of Belelubsky was remarkable progress toward understanding the mechanical properties of carbon steel. In 1882, Belelubsky was the first in Russia to raise the question of whether steel should be used in the construction of railway bridges. This proposal was not immediately supported by the Ministry of Railways, obviously because steel had not yet been systematically used in metal bridges in Austria, while in Germany it had been used with some caution under specifications of that day. Having assessed the physical and chemical properties of carbon steel, Belelubsky concluded that, contrary to the widespread opinion of the time, steel would be a much more reliable material in bridge building, compared to wrought iron. Belelubsky managed to achieve that steel replaced wrought iron in the construction of bridges on the four major sections of the Trans-Siberian Railroad. The specifications for steel that had been developed by Belelubsky formed the foundation for similar specifications developed later abroad.

When designing the bridges over the Volga river near Tver in 1885 and the Belaya River in Ufa in 1886, Belelubsky proposed an innovative constructive solution called “the free carriageway” that uses hinges for connecting transverse floor-beams to bottom chords in a freely chosen angle. This design allowed to shorten the length of panels making the structural frames easier and reducing secondary stresses in truss members. The presence of vertical load-bearing members greatly simplified the design of cradles, base frames and structural connections used in trusses. Such a type of connecting method was considered to be groundbreaking in the days of Belelubsky. It received a gold medal at the Edinburg Exposition 1890 and later came to be known as the “Russian connecting method”.

From 1893 to 1897, Belelubsky was called in for the design of the railway bridge across the Ob River near Novonikolaevsky (now Novosibirsk). This was one of the great bridges across the intervening rivers on the Great Siberian Way, providing a vital link between the two largest segments of the Great Siberian Way ― the West Siberian and Middle Siberian Railway. The bridge was for the first time in Russia equipped with a truss superstructure of the cantilever-beam type, while the bridge itself became the longest on the West Siberian Railway. The bridge commission, headed by Belelubsky, carried out tests on the bridge on 28 March (9 April) 1897 by placing simultaneously 4 locomotives (each of 51.5 tons) in the spans. The bridge was opened to traffic on 5 (17) April 1897

The apogee of his engineering career became the Romanovsky bridge across the Volga river near Zelenodolsk that was built in 1909-1913. It was renamed the Red Bridge after the October revolution of 1917. Due to length of the spans, the engineer found it feasible to reduce their number (six large and two small). The bridge was opened to traffic on July 11 1913, and it had served well until 2006, when it has undergone renovation.

His last major project became the bridge at Rostov-on-Don, built in 1912-1917, which he designed in cooperation with G.P. Peredery and S. Belzetsky.

Belelubsky developed his own method of building caissons, which later came to be called the "caisson-slipper" method. Besides, he spent much of his time analyzing the properties of building materials, especially reinforced concrete.

Belelubsky has made enormous contributions to Russian science, representing his country at many international exhibitions and forums. His projects were represented at several famous expositions, including Paris expositions in 1878, 1889 and 1900, the Edinburgh exposition in 1890, and Chicago in 1893. He attained a civil rank of Active State Councillor, and his international recognition included an honorary doctorate from the Technical University of Berlin in 1907, an honorary membership in the Architekten- und Ingenieur-Verein zu Berlin in 1909 and an honorary membership in the French Society of Civil Engineers. He was also a member of International Association of Railroad Congresses and an honorary member of the Institute of Concrete in England.

In St. Petersburg he lived several years at Serpukhovskaya Street 4, moving in 1910 to Bronnitskaya Street 14a.

Nikolay Belelubsky died on August 4, 1922 in Saint Petersburg, and was buried in the Novodevichy Cemetery.

According to the testimony of contemporaries, Belelubsky was a man of high culture and internal content. Modesty, devotion and material unselfishness were main personal traits of the founder of the Russian school of bridge building and a "poet" of bridge designing. 

At the same time, the outstanding scientist was considered to be a poor and oddish man, given the standards of the society he lived in. But Belelubsky himself never suffered emotionally from this circumstance, preferring spiritual values to material goods, while serving the people was the greatest happiness for him.

Bridges
 Alexandrovsky Bridge on the Volga at Syzran, 1876–80
 Dnieper Bridge at Ekaterinoslav (later Dniepropetrovsk, today Dnipro, 1882–84
 Volga Bridge at Tver, 1885–87
 Belaya Bridge at Ufa, 1886–88
 Irtysh Bridge at Omsk, 1893–96
 Ob Bridge near Novosibirsk, 1893–97
 American Bridge on the Neva, 1896–97
 Rusanovsky Bridge at Kiev, 1904-0
 Finland Bridge on the Neva, 1910–12
 Romanovsky Bridge at Zelenodolsk (collapsed during construction 22 November 1911), 1910–13
 Don Bridge at Rostov-on-Don, 1912–17

Education activities
Belelubsky made substantial educational efforts to prepare railroad engineers for the country. In addition to the Institute of Transport, he also lectured at the Mining Institute, the Institute of Civil Engineers, the Imperial Academy of Arts and Women's Polytechnic courses. His work "The Course of Structural Mechanics" (1885) became the most popular textbook for students and a reference book for many engineers.

He used to tell his students:  "You are future engineers. What can be better? You will design and build bridges. Bridges are built to last for a hundred years or more. Search for the best design, techniques and construction methods. But don't forget one thing: you must be the masters of your own construction projects. Not owners, but masters, because you build for the State, for the people. Build efficiently, carefully, sparingly, firmly and originally. Every epoch brings its useful novelty, each engineer must take a step forward in his practice. Anyway, he should strive to it, otherwise he is not an engineer, not the master of his own craft".

It is notable that he initiated the additional courses called "Society of Academic Support for Weak Students" and "Society on Fund raising for technical learning for women".

See also
 Ufa Rail Bridge
 The first railway bridge over the Ob River
 The American Bridge
 Nikolai Garin-Mikhailovsky
 Konstantin Mikhaylovsky
 Lavr Proskouriakov
 Nikolai Tikhomirov

References

Notes

External links
 "Civil engineers of the Great Siberian railway". http://archive.yourmuseum.ru/project/sib-foto/transsib/prolet/ingq.htm
 "Construction of railkway bridge across the Ob River". http://archive.yourmuseum.ru/project/sib-foto/transsib/prolet/obmq.htm
 "North Caucasus Railways". http://eng.rzd.ru/statice/public/en?STRUCTURE_ID=4332&layer_id=4516&refererLayerId=4516&id=2560
 St. Petersburg Encyclopedia (online), entry "Beleyubsky N.A." http://www.encspb.ru/object/2804012606?lc=en
 "Transsib Persons". http://old.transsib.ru/Eng/gal-men.htm
 "The Trans-Siberian Route," Wonders of World Engineering, Part 15 (8 June 1937) and Part 16 (15 June 1937). http://wondersofworldengineering.com/trans-siberian-railway.html
 "West Siberian Railways". http://eng.rzd.ru/statice/public/en?STRUCTURE_ID=4332&layer_id=4516&refererLayerId=4516&id=2550
 «Поселок Новониколаевский». http://prometeus.nsc.ru/gorod/history/100let-2ssi (in Russian)

1845 births
1922 deaths
Engineers from Kharkiv
People from Kharkovsky Uyezd
Russian nobility
Civil engineers from the Russian Empire
Bridge engineers
Inventors from the Russian Empire
Full Members of the Imperial Academy of Arts
Burials at Novodevichy Cemetery